Abdel Rachid Noufou Zagré (born 9 March 2004) is a Burkinabè footballer who currently plays for FC Sion and the Burkina Faso national team.

Club career
Zagré was a product of the JS Konsa academy. He played his final season of domestic football at Rail Club du Kadiogo of the Burkinabé Premier League. In May 2022 it was announced that Zagré would join Swiss club FC Sion on a 4-year contract in the summer transfer window. He reportedly also drew interest from Basel and Anderlecht.

International career
Zagré captained the national under-20 side in 2023 Africa U-20 Cup of Nations qualification. He scored against Nigeria and Ghana in the Group Stage. He received his first senior call up for a friendlies against Belgium and Kosovo in March 2022. He went on to make his senior debut in the match against Belgium on 29 March.

International career statistics

References

External links
FC Sion profile
National Football Teams profile
Soccerway profile

2004 births
Living people
Association football forwards
Burkinabé footballers
Burkina Faso international footballers
Burkina Faso youth international footballers
Burkinabé Premier League players
ASF Bobo Dioulasso players
Rail Club du Kadiogo players
FC Sion players
Burkinabé expatriate footballers
Burkinabé expatriate sportspeople in Switzerland
Expatriate footballers in Switzerland